Two Fisted Justice is a 1931 American Western film directed by George Arthur Durlam that takes place during the American Civil War. The film stars Tom Tyler, Barbara Weeks, and William Walling.

Plot
As the Civil War begins, Carson is sent by President Lincoln to protect a frontier outpost. Accompanied by youngster Danny, Carson thwarts a band of stagecoach robbers and saves a wagon train.

Cast
 Tom Tyler as Kentucky Carson
 Barbara Weeks as Nancy Cameron
 Bobbie Nelson as Danny
 William Walling as Nick Slavin
 John Elliot as Cameron
 Gordon De Main as Huton
 Yakima Canutt as Perkins
 Pedro Regas as Cheyenne Charley
 Carl de Loro as Red
 Kit Guard as Temple

References

External links
 

1931 films
American black-and-white films
American Western (genre) films
1931 Western (genre) films
Monogram Pictures films
1930s English-language films
1930s American films